Davit Kokhia (born 22 April 1993) is a Georgian footballer who plays as a midfielder for Shevardeni-1906 Tbilisi.

Club career
Born in Moscow, Kokhia started playing for FC Spartak Moscow's youth team. In 2008, he moved to Ukraine, where he continued his youth career with KSDYUSHOR Kiyv and Atlet Kiyv. In 2009, he played for Smena–Obolon Kiyv before joining FC Dynamo Kyiv Reserves and Youth Team in 2010.

He played at the youth level for FC Dynamo Kyiv until January 2011, when he moved to Russia and joined FC Volga Nizhny Novgorod.  In the 2011 and 2012 season, he played for Volga in the Russian Youth/Reserves Championship. He made 25 appearances and scored one goal in the 2011 season, 7 appearances with no goals in the 2012 season, and 27 appearances with no goals in 2012–13. In the 2013–14 season, he played for FC Gagra in the Georgian Premier League.  In summer 2014, he moved to FC Zaria Bălți and played in the Moldovan National Division.

On 13 February 2015, after passing trials, he signed a year and a half contract with Serbian side FK Vojvodina. However, after not playing a single official game for the club, the contract with Vojvodina was mutually terminated after just six months.

In summer 2016, he returned to Georgia and signed with FC Zugdidi.

International career
In 2012, he was part of the Georgian U-19 team, and that same year he made his debut for the Georgian U-21 team and continued as part of the U-21 team in 2013.  However, for the official UEFA matches, he made only one appearance for the Georgian U-21 team.

References

1993 births
Living people
Footballers from Moscow
Footballers from Georgia (country)
Association football midfielders
FC Volga Nizhny Novgorod players
FC Gagra players
CSF Bălți players
FK Vojvodina players
FC Zugdidi players
PFC Sumy players
Erovnuli Liga players
Moldovan Super Liga players
Ukrainian First League players
Georgia (country) under-21 international footballers
Expatriate footballers from Georgia (country)
Expatriate footballers in Moldova
Expatriate footballers in Serbia
Expatriate footballers in Ukraine
FC Shevardeni-1906 Tbilisi players